The Tavistock Cup was a team golf event played in Florida that featured the top-ranked golf professional members of six international golf clubs: Albany, Isleworth, Lake Nona, Oak Tree National, Primland, and Queenwood. The two-day tournament was an officially sanctioned, unofficial-money PGA Tour event. The inaugural Tavistock Cup matches were held at Lake Nona Golf & Country Club in 2004.

Through 2010, the Tavistock Cup was contested by Isleworth and Lake Nona golf clubs. In 2011, the Tavistock Cup was expanded with the addition of teams representing the clubs of Albany and Queenwood, which are located in the Bahamas and Surry, England, respectively.

Opened in 2010, Albany was Tavistock Group’s newest golf club community, and Queenwood became the first golf club not developed by Tavistock Group to participate in the Tavistock Cup. In 2013, the Tavistock Cup further expanded to a six-team competition by adding Oak Tree National and Primland golf clubs.

Each team consisted of four golf professional members who play for prize money, team hole-in-one prizes and the title of World Golf and Country Club Champion. The professional members of these six golf clubs had collectively won more than 1,012 worldwide tournaments, including 67 major championships, through 2012.

Tickets were not sold to the public; only club members, residents, sponsors, designated charities and invited guests were able to attend the event. Once in, there were no ropes separating spectators from the players. Spectators wore the official team colors of Albany Pink, Isleworth Red, Lake Nona Blue, Oak Tree Orange, Primland Gold or Queenwood Green to show their support for their team.

The Tavistock Cup was televised each year on the Golf Channel in the United States and Canada and on international affiliates throughout the United Kingdom, Asia, Australia, Latin America and South Africa.

History
The Tavistock Cup began in 2004 as a friendly crosstown rivalry between Isleworth and Lake Nona. Each year, the clubs' golf professional members, all of whom are members or residents at either club, compete for the title of World Golf and Country Club Champion. 

Isleworth clinched the inaugural victory of the Tavistock Cup in 2004 at Lake Nona. In 2005 the event was played at Isleworth, where each team earned 8 ½ points out of a possible 17 at the end of regulation play. After three holes of sudden death, play was called due to darkness and the teams finished in a tie. Since a winner was not declared, the captains decided the competition should return to Isleworth in 2006. That year Team Isleworth secured another victory.

In 2007, Team Lake Nona claimed their first Tavistock Cup by defeating Team Isleworth with a final score of 22-8. Tiger Woods shot 8-under-par (64) on Tuesday and took home the Payne Stewart Salver Award for low medalist. Retief Goosen was awarded a brand-new 2007 Cadillac Escalade after his shot landed closest to the pin on Hole #17 on Tuesday, one foot and 10 inches from the hole. Besides leading his team to victory, Ernie Els also secured an additional $100,000 for his team by winning the Old Mutual Long Drive Challenge on Monday at Hole #11.

In 2008, the Tavistock Cup returned to Isleworth where the home team defended their turf and beat Team Lake Nona with a final score of 19½ - 11½. J. B. Holmes swept the competition by winning the Old Mutual Long Drive Challenge, the Cadillac Closet to the Pin and the Payne Stewart Salver Award for low medalist with a score of -4 (68).

In 2009, Isleworth took a 6 to 4 point lead into the second day singles matches, but Lake Nona rallied and won 11 points outright and halved four matches. Isleworth scored seven points in singles play. This left Lake Nona with 17 points and Isleworth 13. The Old Mutual Long Drive Challenge was won by Retief Goosen, who hit a 325-yard drive on Hole #9, and by Tiger Woods, who hit a 320-yard drive on Hole #15. The closest to the pin shot of the tournament was hit by Ben Curtis who landed his tee shot on Hole #4 four feet and two inches from the cup. The Payne Stewart Salver Award went to Graeme McDowell, who shot a 6-under-par (66) during Round 2. It was the second Tavistock Cup win for Lake Nona and the first Payne Stewart Medalist for the team.

In 2010, Lake Nona claimed its second consecutive Tavistock Cup title and third overall win over Isleworth with a score of 17-13. Team Isleworth's Nick O'Hern claimed the low medalist for Day Two posting a score of -7 (65). He took home the Payne Stewart Salver Award and the $300,000 prize. Team Lake Nona's Graeme McDowell was runner-up with a score of (-5) 67. Team Lake Nona's Retief Goosen claimed the closest to the pin challenge on Hole # 2, Team Isleworth's Robert Allenby on Hole #5, Team Isleworth's J.B. Holmes on Hole # 11 and Team Lake Nona's Ben Curtis on Hole # 15. The past seven matches have left Isleworth and Lake Nona tied in the series. Each club has claimed three Tavistock Cup titles, with the 2005 matches ending in a tie following a sudden-death playoff.

In 2011, Tavistock Cup introduced a new format, adding two additional clubs to the interclub matches, Albany and Queenwood Golf Club. Tavistock Cup's 24-man field hailed from all corners of the globe. Team Lake Nona dominated Round 2 of the Tavistock Cup capturing its fourth win in the tournament’s eight-year history. With a score of 43-under par, Team Lake Nona overtook Team Isleworth on their home turf in the singles stroke-play format. As the low medalist for Day Two, Lake Nona’s Oliver Wilson helped lead his team to victory with a score of -7 (65). Wilson took home the Payne Stewart Salver Award and the $200,000 prize. Team Isleworth’s Robert Allenby was runner-up with a score of -6 (66). Team Albany came in 16 shots behind Lake Nona at 27-under par. Isleworth came in third place with a score of 25-under par. Queenwood finished fourth at 18-under par. 

The 2012 Tavistock Cup featured the same four teams and was contested at Lake Nona Golf & Country Club for the first time since 2009. Lake Nona won the Tavistock Cup for the fourth consecutive time and has collected five overall Tavistock Cup victories in 2007, 2009, 2010, 2011 and 2012. For the first time since the tournament’s inception, the Payne Stewart Salver Award was shared by five participants who finished the final round at 5-under-par (67): Robert Allenby, Thomas Bjorn, Ernie Els, Ross Fisher and Retief Goosen. The Salver Award is given each year in memory of the former Isleworth member and late champion golfer Payne Stewart to the player with the lowest score in the final round.

2011 Tavistock Cup
The 2011 Tavistock Cup was contested at Isleworth Golf & Country Club, March 14 and 15.

Team Albany was represented by Arjun Atwal, Ernie Els, Trevor Immelman, Ian Poulter, Justin Rose and Tiger Woods.

Team Isleworth's lineup included Robert Allenby, Stuart Appleby, Brian Davis, J. B. Holmes, Sean O'Hair and Lee Janzen.

Team Lake Nona was represented by Ross Fisher, Retief Goosen, Peter Hanson, Graeme McDowell, Henrik Stenson and Oliver Wilson.

Team Queenwood's competitors included Thomas Bjørn, Darren Clarke, David Howell, Søren Kjeldsen, Paul McGinley and Adam Scott. Queenwood is the first club outside of Tavistock Group to participate in the tournament.

Lake Nona won the World Golf and Country Club title for the third consecutive year and the fourth time in Tavistock Cup history.

2012 Tavistock Cup
The 2012 Tavistock Cup was contested at Lake Nona Golf & Country Club, March 19 and 20.

The rosters were:
Team Albany: Tim Clark, Ernie Els, Trevor Immelman, Ian Poulter, Justin Rose and Tiger Woods. 
Team Isleworth: Robert Allenby, Daniel Chopra, Charles Howell III, Sean O'Hair, and newcomers Bo Van Pelt and Bubba Watson. 
Team Lake Nona: Ben Curtis, Ross Fisher, Retief Goosen, Peter Hanson, Graeme McDowell and Tavistock Cup rookie Gary Woodland. 
Team Queenwood: Thomas Bjørn, David Howell, Søren Kjeldsen, newcomer Tom Lewis, Paul McGinley and Adam Scott.

The tournament was won by Team Lake Nona for the fourth consecutive time. Scores: Lake Nona –41, Isleworth –39, Queenwood –31, Albany –26

2013 Tavistock Cup
The 2013 Tavistock Cup was contested at Isleworth Golf & Country Club March 25 and 26.

The rosters were:
Team Albany: Tim Clark, Ian Poulter, Justin Rose and Tiger Woods. 
Team Isleworth: Brian Davis, D. A. Points, Bo Van Pelt and Bubba Watson. 
Team Lake Nona: Ross Fisher, Peter Hanson, Graeme McDowell and Henrik Stenson. 
Team Oak Tree National: Rickie Fowler, Charles Howell III, Bob Tway and Scott Verplank.
Team Primland: Fred Couples, Bill Haas, Jay Haas and Webb Simpson. 
Team Queenwood: Martin Laird, Tom Lewis, Paul McGinley and Adam Scott.

Past players

Isleworth
Robert Allenby
Stuart Appleby
Arjun Atwal
Darren Clarke
Daniel Chopra
John Cook
Paula Creamer
Robert Damron
Scott Hoch
J. B. Holmes
Charles Howell III
Lee Janzen
Sean O'Hair
Nick O'Hern
Mark O'Meara
Craig Parry
Bo Van Pelt
Bubba Watson
Tiger Woods

Lake Nona
Ben Curtis
Chris DiMarco
Ernie Els
Nick Faldo
Ross Fisher
Sergio García
Retief Goosen
Peter Hanson
Trevor Immelman
Maarten Lafeber
Graeme McDowell
Mark McNulty
Ian Poulter
Justin Rose
Annika Sörenstam
Henrik Stenson
Sven Strüver
Gary Woodland

Albany
Arjun Atwal
Tim Clark
Ernie Els
Trevor Immelman
Ian Poulter
Justin Rose
Tiger Woods

Queenwood
Thomas Bjørn
Darren Clarke
David Howell
Søren Kjeldsen
Tom Lewis
Paul McGinley
Adam Scott

Purse
Purse:
$2.15 million

Team prize breakdown:
Winning team received $600,000
Runner-up team received $400,000
Third-place team received $300,000
Fourth-, fifth- and sixth-place team received $50,000 per player.
Long Drive Challenge took place on Hole #7 during Round 1 and awarded $40,000 to be split among the four members of the team with the player who hit the longest drive. 
The par 3s featured team hole-in-one prizes, but the player who hit the single best shot on each of these holes over the two-day competition received a gift valued at $20,000 or more from Sentient Jet on Hole #2, Audemars Piguet  on Hole #5, Polk Audio  on Hole #11 and Hugo Boss on Hole #15.  
Should a player hit a hole-in-one, that player won the prize for his entire team and himself. If a player hit a hole-in-one on Hole #15, then each of the players on that team received $50,000 to direct to the charities of their choosing on behalf of Hugo Boss. 

Individual prize breakdown:
The Payne Stewart Salver Award was presented to the low Medalist on Tuesday along with $100,000
Runner-up Medalist - $75,000
Third Place Medalist - $50,000

Results

(*In 2005, both teams earned 8½ of the possible 17 points after 18 holes.  After three holes in a sudden death tie-breaker, play was called due to darkness.  Each player on both teams took home $87,500 each.)

References

External links

Albany
Isleworth Golf & Country Club
Lake Nona Golf & Country Club
Oak Tree National Golf Club
Primland
Queenwood Golf Club
Tavistock Group
Golf Channel coverage

Team golf tournaments
PGA Tour unofficial money events
Golf in Florida
Tavistock Group